Third Power is the third studio album by American hip hop disc jockey DJ Drama, released on October 11, 2011. It marks his first album not to be released in the Gangsta Grillz series, after his previous two studio albums Gangsta Grillz: The Album (2007) and Gangsta Grillz: The Album (Vol. 2) (2009). Featured guests on the album include Fabolous, Wiz Khalifa, Roscoe Dash, Freddie Gibbs, Young Jeezy, Wale, J. Cole, Chris Brown, Pusha T, French Montana, Crooked I, B.o.B, Gucci Mane, Ya Boy, Akon, Trey Songz, and Big Sean, among others.

Background
Initially, the album was set to be titled Gangsta Grillz: The Album (Vol. 3), continuing the sequential titles of his previous two releases: however, in an interview at the BET Awards on July 8, 2011, he revealed that he had changed the album's title to Third Power. In a press release, DJ Drama spoke about how he felt the album was his best to date: he felt it was his "biggest and best yet" and that it represents three generations of hip-hop: "the music I came up on, the movements that I was a part of, and a whole new generation of Hip-Hop that is changing the face of music". The album leaked October 8, 2011.

Singles
The album's lead single, "Oh My", was released as a digital download on June 17, 2011. The song features guest appearances from American hip-hop artists Fabolous, Wiz Khalifa and Roscoe Dash, and features production from record producer Drumma Boy. The song debuted at number one-hundred on the US Billboard Hot 100 on the week ending August 6, 2011, becoming DJ Drama's first appearance on the chart, and also peaked at number nineteen on the Hot R&B/Hip-Hop Songs chart and number twelve on the Hot Rap Songs charts in the United States, also becoming his highest peaking song on both of these charts. It has since peaked at #95 on the Hot 100. The official remix to "Oh My" features Trey Songz, 2 Chainz, & Big Sean. On September 13, 2011 it was revealed "Never See You Again" featuring Wale & Talia Coles would be the album's second single. However, "Ain't No Way Around It" featuring Future was released instead, and it peaked at #98 on the Hot R&B/Hip-Hop Songs chart. After the release of Third Power, "Undercover" featuring Chris Brown and J. Cole debuted at #15 on the Bubbling Under R&B/Hip-Hop Songs chart.

Track listing

Sample credits
 "Never See You Again", contains a sample of "Take Me to the Mardi Gras", as performed by Bob James, "Tha Light", as performed by Common, "Love's Gonna Get'cha (Material Love)", as performed by Boogie Down Productions and "Never See You Again", as performed by Talia Coles featuring KO Stiggity.

Charts

References

2011 albums
DJ Drama albums
E1 Music albums
Albums produced by Drumma Boy
Albums produced by Akon
Albums produced by Mike Will Made It
Albums produced by Nard & B
Albums produced by Cardiak